"Araw-Araw" is a song by Filipino folk-pop band Ben&Ben, composed by lead vocalists Miguel Benjamin Guico and Paolo Benjamin Guico. It was released alongside "Pagtingin" on May 2, 2019. This song was used as the theme song of the film LSS (Last Song Syndrome) released in 2019 under Globe Studios, to which it went on to win the 2019 Pista ng Pelikulang Pilipino Award for Best Original Song.

Music video
The music video of the song was directed by Quark Henares and produced by Globe Studios as a sequel to the music video of "Pagtingin", with appearances from Gabbi Garcia and Khalil Ramos and was released on September 28, 2019.

Awards and nominations

References

2019 songs
Ben&Ben songs
Tagalog-language songs